Events in the year 1932 in the Kingdom of Iraq.

Incumbents
Faisal I of Iraq, King, 23 August 1921-8 September 1933
Naji Shawkat, Prime Minister, 3 November 1932–20 March 1933
Menahem Saleh Daniel, Senator, 1925-1932

Events

Iraq received its independence on 3 October, ending the British Mandate which began in 1920
Iraq joined the League of Nations on 6 October
The Ahmed-Mustafa Barzani revolts, which began in 1931, were suppressed
The government stopped issuing Indian Rupees and started issuing Iraqi dinars
Iraqi Red Crescent Society was founded in Baghdad
Al Shorta SC, multi-sport club based in Rusafa District, was established on 14 November

Births
Shahab Sheikh Nuri, politician and grandson of Mahmud Barzanji, born in Sulaymaniyah
 Nuzhat Katzav, author and Israeli politician, member of the Knesset, born 1 April in Baghdad (died 2022).
Tahir Allauddin Al-Qadri Al-Gillani, head of the Sufi Qadiriyya Baghdadia Spiritual Tariqa, born on 18 June in Baghdad
Bahija Ahmed Shihab, Iraqi sociologist and one of the pioneering women that helped establish the Sociology department at the College of Arts, University of Baghdad, born on 1 July in Baghdad
Abdul Jerri, Iraqi-American mathematician
Shmuel Moreh, born in Baghdad on 22 Decemberprofessor emeritus in the Department for Arabic Language and Literature at the Hebrew University and a recipient of the Israel Prize in Middle Eastern studies in 1999.

Deaths
Faisal I of Iraq, King, on 8 September 1933
Sassoon Eskell, the Kingdom's first Finance Minister

References

 
Iraq
Years of the 20th century in Iraq